La Mussara is a mountain of Catalonia, Spain. It is the highest peak of the Serra de la Mussara, a subrange of the Prades Mountains. 
Located north of the town of Vilaplana, La Mussara has an elevation of 1055 metres above sea level.

This mountain is named after the abandoned village of La Mussara, located in the range.
There is a triangulation station at the summit (ref. 262132001).

See also
Prades Mountains
Mountains of Catalonia

References

Mountains of Catalonia
Emblematic summits of Catalonia